Recreo is a town in Santa Fe Province, Argentina founded in 1890 as a general human settlement but made officially a city in 2005. Two major roads run through Recreo, Route 11 (country-level) and province-level Route-70.

Due to significant local government investment over the 20th and 21st century, Recreo has 18 schools, 15 public schools, 2 'religious' schools and one private kindergarten. Recreo also receives frequent floods from the adjacent Salado River.

References 

1890 establishments in Argentina